Jaan Mõttus (28 September 1891 Kuigatsi Parish, Tartu County – 15 May 1942 Kuigatsi Parish, Valga County) was an Estonian politician. He was a member of V Riigikogu.

References

1891 births
1942 deaths
Members of the Riigikogu, 1932–1934